Peperomia dolabriformis is a species of plant in the genus Peperomia in the family Piperaceae.  The species is also known as prayer pepper. The plant is used as an ornamental houseplant. It is native to Ecuador and Peru.

Accepted varieties
 Peperomia dolabriformis var. brachyphylla Rauh
 Peperomia dolabriformis var. confertifolia Yunck.
 Peperomia dolabriformis var. glaucescens C.DC.
 Peperomia dolabriformis var. grandis Hutchison ex Pino & Klopf.
 Peperomia dolabriformis var. lombardii Pino
 Peperomia dolabriformis var. multicaulis Pino & Cieza
 Peperomia dolabriformis var. velutina Trel.

References

 F. W. H. A. von Humboldt et al., Nov. gen. sp. 1:50[folio]; 1:60[quarto], t. 4. 1816

Endemic flora of Ecuador
dolabriformis